Daniel S. Delp  (born December 26, 1964) was a Republican member of the Pennsylvania State Senate for the 28th District from 1985 to 1988.

Life
Born in York, Pennsylvania on December 26, 1964, Delp earned a degree in chemistry from Lebanon Valley College and an engineering degree from Penn State-Reading.  Delp was elected to represent the state's 28th senatorial district in 1994.

He did not run for re-election in 1998 after he was prosecuted for hiring an underage  prostitute and buying her alcohol with his Senate expense account.

References

External links
Pennsylvania State Senate profile

Living people
1964 births
People from York County, Pennsylvania
Pennsylvania state senators
Pennsylvania politicians convicted of crimes